Madhuca primoplagensis is a tree in the family Sapotaceae. The specific epithet primoplagensis means "first region", referring to Sarawak's First or Kuching Division, the tree's native habitat.

Description
The bark is dark brown. Inflorescences bear up to 13 flowers.

Distribution and habitat
Madhuca primoplagensis is endemic to Borneo, where it is known only from Sarawak. Its habitat is lowland forests from  altitude.

Conservation
Madhuca primoplagensis has been assessed as endangered on the IUCN Red List. The species is threatened by logging conversion of land to palm oil plantations.

References

primoplagensis
Endemic flora of Borneo
Trees of Borneo
Flora of Sarawak
Plants described in 2001